Trevor Bassitt (born February 26, 1998) is an American track and field athlete.

Collegiate career
Trevor competed at Ashland University, an NCAA Division II school. He was coached by Jud Logan.

Professional career
Currently an unsponsored athlete, and without a permanent coach following the death of Jud Logan in the winter of 2022, Bassitt won the gold medal in the men's 400 metres event at the 2022 USA Indoor Track and Field Championships held in Spokane, Washington.

He finished 2nd at the 2022 USA Outdoor Track and Field Championships in the 400m hurdles with a time of 47.47 s, to qualify for the 2022 World Athletics Championships.

He won the bronze medal in the men's 400 metres hurdles event at the 2022 World Athletics Championships held in Eugene, Oregon, United States. Following this individual medal, Trevor was selected as a member of the team USA 4x400m relay to compete in the qualifying heats. As the anchor leg of the relay, the team won their heat in 2:58.96 to qualify for the finals. While not a member of the team competing in the finals, he also earned a gold medal by virtue of team USA winning the 4x400m event.  He won the silver medal in the men's 400 metres event at the 2022 World Athletics Indoor Championships held in Belgrade, Serbia.

International competitions

References

External links 
 
 Ashland Eagles bio

Living people
1998 births
Place of birth missing (living people)
American male sprinters
World Athletics Indoor Championships medalists
World Athletics Championships medalists
World Athletics Championships winners
Ashland Eagles men's track and field athletes
Track and field athletes from Ohio
20th-century American people
21st-century American people